Bodhinatha Veylanswami (born October 15, 1942 in Berkeley, California) is a Hindu sannyasin monk and a religious leader, who is the head of Kauai's Hindu Monastery and publisher of Hinduism Today magazine. He is the 163rd head of the Nandinatha Sampradaya's Kailasa Parampara and Guru at Kauai's Hindu Monastery which is a 382-acre temple-monastery complex on Hawaii's Garden Island.  He is known for his initiative of digitizing the Saiva Agamas, scriptures of the Hindu Saivite religion and the basis for Hindu temple liturgy, making them freely available in digital format and encouraging their study. The Adi Saiva Sivachariyar priestly community honors him as "The Supreme Acharya who has uplifted and preserved the Agamas and the Agama tradition." Bodhinatha presides over three organizations: Saiva Siddhanta Church, Himalayan Academy publications and Hindu Heritage Endowment.

Spiritual lineage
Bodhinatha is the appointed successor of Satguru Sivaya Subramuniyaswami, an influential Hindu Saivite guru. Klaus Klostermaier, one of the world's leading specialists on Hindu studies, said in his A Survey of Hinduism: "Sivaya Subramuniyaswami ... did much to propagate a kind of reformed Saivism through his books. As founder-editor of Hinduism Today, an illustrated monthly, he became the single-most advocate of Hinduism outside India." He ordained Bodhinatha as leader of Saiva Siddhanta Church and 163rd Guru Mahasannidhanam of the Kailasa Parampara lineage, a position of authority in Saivism.

He follows shaivism sect (Shaiva Siddhanta) of Hinduism. He belongs to  Nandinatha Sampradaya's Kailasa Parampara. Saiva siddhanta is prevalent in South India, Sri Lanka and Malaysia.
His Spiritual lineage : Maharishi Nandinath→ Tirumular→ → → nameless rishi from Himalayas →Kadaitswami→  Chellapaswami→ Siva Yogaswami→Sivaya Subramuniyaswami→ Bodhinatha Veylanswami

Worldwide activities

Bodhinatha Veylanswami was a keynote speaker at Hindu Convocation of the Parliament of the World's Religions in Melbourne, Australia, an "assembly of a number of the most outstanding Hindu spiritual leaders of India." He mediated the seminal "Is Yoga Hindu?" session at the Parliament in December 2009, which sparked the Hindu American Foundation's "Take Back Yoga " campaign in 2010.

Bodhinatha is a popular speaker with Hindus, specially those of the Hindu diaspora living in the United States, Malaysia, Mauritius and Singapore. The "Indo-American News" wrote, "Bodhinatha is a formidable force in championing the cause of Hinduism. Soft-spoken yet imbued with immense knowledge and a keen wit, the satguru is a sought-after speaker the world over."

 Under Bodhinatha's guidance, his initiated Hindu swamis, yogis and sadhakas have been erecting Iraivan Temple, America's first all-granite, hand-carved Hindu Temple.

Biography 
Bodhinatha began studying Vedanta and meditation in 1960, soon developing a deep interest in monastic life. In March, 1972, he received sannyas diksha from Sivaya Subramuniyaswami in Alaveddy, Sri Lanka. He received the name Veylanswami a few weeks later at the Murugan Temple in Palani Hills.

In 1988, in preparation for initiation as an acharya in the Saiva Siddhanta Yoga Order, Bodhinatha spent six months on pilgrimage in India with a sadhaka, spending time worshiping and meditating at ashrams and temples from as far north as Rishikesh to Tiruchendur in the South. Upon returning to Kauai, he was ordained as the first acharya of the religious order.

From 1993 Bodhinatha managed the formation and development of Hindu Heritage Endowment, a tax-exempt endowment that provides income to several Hindu initiatives and institutions across the world. There are over 80 individual funds within Hindu Heritage Endowment, which together exceed $10 million.

On October 21, 2001, the tenth evening of Subramuniyaswami's 32-day prayopavesha fast, he asked Bodhinatha to come to his bedside which all the monks had gathered around. He sent for his aadheenakartar pendant, the symbol of the spiritual head of Kauai Aadheenam, then placed it on Bodhinatha's neck, declaring, "You are the guru now."

Images

References 

1942 births
Living people
20th-century Hindu religious leaders
21st-century Hindu religious leaders
American Hindus
Converts to Hinduism
Shaivite religious leaders